Tracy Poirier is a first female commander of the 124th Regiment Regional Training Institute and the sixth female colonel in the history of the Vermont National Guard.

Education and career
Poirier grew up in Barre, Vermont. She was a distinguished graduate of Carlisle Scholars Program, Army War College, and a recipient of master's degree in strategic studies. In 1996, she received her bachelor's degree in English and communications from Norwich University. Poirier also was a Rhodes Scholar and completed her graduate education at Oxford University in England where she obtained two master's degrees in anthropology and human resource management respectively.

Poirier began her career at Norwich University in 2007, serving as the director of Annual Giving and the director of the International Center. Prior to it, she served in a Joint Special Operations Command unit in Iraqi Kurdistan, and following it, served eight years in the United States Marine Corps, being promoted to the rank of lieutenant colonel and becoming public affairs officer. She then served as commander of the Brigade Support Battalion of the 86th Infantry Brigade Combat Team and then was promoted to deputy chief of staff at the Joint Force Headquarters in Colchester, Vermont. Poirier also serves at Regional Training Institute where she teaches army mountain warfare, information operations, and general military education.

References

20th-century births
Living people
Female United States Marine Corps personnel
United States Army War College alumni
Norwich University alumni
Alumni of the University of Oxford
Norwich University faculty
People from Barre, Vermont
Year of birth missing (living people)
American women academics
21st-century American women